The 1986–87 Allsvenskan was the 53rd season of the top division of Swedish handball. 12 teams competed in the league. Redbergslids IK won the regular season and also won the playoffs to claim their 11th Swedish title. IF Saab and SoIK Hellas were relegated.

League table

Playoffs

Semifinals
Redbergslids IK–Ystads IF 24–20, 26–27, 26–20 (Redbergslids IK advance to the finals)
GUIF–HK Drott 19–11, 17–21, 16–23 (HK Drott advance to the finals)

Finals
Redbergslids IK–HK Drott 22–14, 18–16, 7–26, 20–18 (Redbergslids IK champions)

References 

Swedish handball competitions